Gaston Péloquin (11 December 1939 – 1 September 1994) was a Canadian politician, who represented the electoral district of Brome—Missisquoi in the House of Commons from 1993 to 1994.

He was born in Granby, Quebec. Péloquin, who was a teacher before entering politics, was elected in the 1993 election as a Bloc Québécois candidate. However, after less than a year in office, he died in a car accident on 1 September 1994.

In the resulting byelection, he was succeeded by Denis Paradis.

Electoral record

External links
 

1939 births
1994 deaths
Accidental deaths in Quebec
Bloc Québécois MPs
Members of the House of Commons of Canada from Quebec
People from Granby, Quebec
Road incident deaths in Canada